Get Off may refer to:

 "Get Off" (Foxy song), 1978
 Get Off (Foxy album)
 "Get Off" (The Dandy Warhols song), 2000
 Get Off (Haywire album), 1992

See also 
 "Gett Off", a song by Prince and The New Power Generation
 Getting Off (disambiguation)